Łukasz Jarosz (born January 12, 1979) is a Polish heavyweight kickboxer. He is former I.S.K.A. World Super Heavyweight champion.

Kickboxing career
Jarosz was born on January 12, 1979, in Rabka-Zdrój. He fought Ismail Yesil during Thai & Kickboxgala for the ISKA Heavyweight Low Kick title. Jarosz won the fight by a third round KO. He defended the title by a third round TKO of Senad Hadžić in January 2007.

Jarosz took part in the K-1 Poland tournament. He scored a KO win over Daniel Waciakowski in the quarterfinals, and a KO win over Igor Kukurydzyak in the semifinals. He won the tournament by a second round TKO of Marcin Rozalski.

He lost to Aziz Jahjah during the Beast of the East event in May 2008.

Jarosz fought Łukasz Jurkowski in October 2008. He won the fight by a decision.

Łukasz lost to Brian Douwes by a third round TKO during the Beast of the East event.

He was scheduled to fight Michał Olaś during the Beast of the East event. Jarosz won the fight by decision.

Jarosz returned after a nine year layoff to face Michałem Wlazło. He beat Wlazło by TKO in the second round.

In February 2019, Jarosz fought the former Enfusion heavyweight champion Wendell Roche. He won the fight by a unanimous decision.

Titles

Professional
2007 K-1 Rules Heavyweight Tournament in Poland champion
2006 I.S.K.A. Low-Kick Rules Super-heavyweight World Champion +96.5 kg (1 title def.)

Amateur
2005 W.A.K.O. World Championships in Agadir, Morocco  +91 kg (Low-Kick)
2004 W.A.K.O. European Championships in Budva, Serbia and Montenegro  +91 kg (Low-Kick)
2003 W.A.K.O. World Championships 2003 in Paris, France  -91 kg (Full-Contact)
1999 Polish champion in Oyama Karate
1998 Polish champion in Oyama Karate
1997 Polish champion in Oyama Karate

Professional kickboxing record

|-
|-  bgcolor="#CCFFCC"
| 2019-02-24 || Win ||align=left| Wendell Roche || DSF Kickboxing Challenge 20 || Warsaw, Poland || TKO  || 2 || 
|-
|-  bgcolor="#CCFFCC"
| 2018-05-25 || Win ||align=left| Michał Wlazło  || Boxing Night 14 || Kraków, Poland || Decision (Unanimous) || 3|| 3:00
|-
|-  bgcolor="#CCFFCC"
| 2009-11-14 || Win ||align=left| Michał Olaś  || Beast of the East || Gdynia, Poland || Decision  || 3 || 3:00
|-
|-  bgcolor="#FFBBBB"
| 2009-05-10 || Loss ||align=left| Brian Douwes || Angels of Fire V || Plock, Poland || KO (punches)  || 3 || 
|-
|-  bgcolor="#CCFFCC"
| 2008-10-25 || Win ||align=left| Łukasz Jurkowski  || Maxxx Fight || Warsaw, Poland || Decision (Unanimous)  || 3 || 3:00
|-
|-  bgcolor="#FFBBBB"
| 2008-05-31 || Loss ||align=left| Aziz Jahjah || Beast of the east || Zutphen, Netherlands || TKO (Referee stoppage)  || 1 || 
|-
|-  bgcolor="#CCFFCC"
| 2008-04-06 || Win ||align=left| Will Riva || K-1 Europe MAX 2008 || Warsaw, Poland || KO  || 2 || 1:43
|-
|-  bgcolor="#FFBBBB"
| 2007-06-29 || Loss ||align=left| Dzhamal Kasumov || Kickboxing Fighting European Tour 2007, Semi Finals || Martigues, France || Decision  || 3 || 3:00
|-
|-  bgcolor="#CCFFCC"
| 2007-06-29 || Win ||align=left| Paula Mataele || Kickboxing Fighting European Tour 2007, Quarter Finals || Martigues, France || Decision  || 3 || 3:00
|-
|-  bgcolor="#CCFFCC"
| 2007-06-09 || Win ||align=left| Marcin Rozalski ||  K-1 Rules Heavyweight Tournament 2007 in Poland, Final || Nowy Targ, Poland || TKO  || 2 || 
|-
! style=background:white colspan=9 |
|- 
|-  bgcolor="#CCFFCC"
| 2007-06-09 || Win ||align=left| Igor Kukurydzyak ||  K-1 Rules Heavyweight Tournament 2007 in Poland, Semi Finals || Nowy Targ, Poland || KO  || 1 || 
|-
|-  bgcolor="#CCFFCC"
| 2007-06-09 || Win ||align=left| Daniel Waciakowski ||  K-1 Rules Heavyweight Tournament 2007 in Poland, Quarter Finals || Nowy Targ, Poland || KO  || 1 || 
|-
|-  bgcolor="#CCFFCC"
| 2007-01-06 || Win ||align=left| Senad Hadžić ||  Night of Glory || Nowy Targ, Poland || TKO  || 3 || 
|-
! style=background:white colspan=9 |
|- 
|-  bgcolor="#CCFFCC"
| 2006-03-11 || Win ||align=left| Ismail Yesil || Thai & Kickboxgala ||  || KO  || 3 || 
|-
! style=background:white colspan=9 |
|- 
|-
| colspan=9 | Legend:

See also
 List of male kickboxers

References 

1979 births
Heavyweight kickboxers
Kyokushin kaikan practitioners
Living people
People from Rabka-Zdrój
Polish male karateka
Polish male kickboxers
Sportspeople from Lesser Poland Voivodeship